The Talkeetna Formation is a geologic formation in Alaska. It preserves fossils dating back to the Early Jurassic period.

See also 
 List of fossiliferous stratigraphic units in Alaska
 Paleontology in Alaska
 Kingak Shale
 Posidonia Shale

References

Further reading 
 A. H. Caruthers and P. L. Smith. 2012. Pliensbachian ammonoids from the Talkeetna Mountains (Peninsular Terrane) of Southern Alaska. Revue de Paléobiologie, Genève, vol. spéc 11:365-378
 M. R. Sandy and R. B. Blodgett. 2000. Early Jurassic spiriferid brachiopods from Alaska and their paleogeographic significance. PaleoBios 33(3):319-328
  J. Pálfy, P. L. Smith, J.K. Mortensen and R.M. Friedman. 1999. Integrated ammonite biochronology and U-Pb geochronometry from a basal Jurassic section in Alaska. Geological Society America Bulletin 111(10):1537-1549
 G. K. Jakobs. 1997. Toarcian (Early Jurassic) ammonoids from western North America. Geological Survey of Canada, Bulletin 428:1-137

Geologic formations of Alaska
Jurassic System of North America
Jurassic Alaska
Pliensbachian Stage
Sinemurian Stage
Toarcian Stage
Sandstone formations of the United States
Siltstone formations
Deep marine deposits
Open marine deposits
Paleontology in Alaska